Le ministère des Transports du Québec, known by its short form name Transports Québec, is a Quebec government ministry responsible for transport, infrastructure and law in Quebec, Canada.

Since 2022, the Minister for Transport is Geneviève Guilbault.

Role and responsibilities
The ministry is responsible for:
 Registration of all vehicles
 Driver licensing
 Driver examination centres
 Provincial highways in the province
 Maintenance of roads and bridges

Ministers for Transports Québec
 Yvon Marcoux April 29, 2003 – February 18, 2005, QLP
 Michel Després February 18, 2005 – December 18, 2008, QLP
 Julie Boulet December 18, 2008 – August 11, 2010, QLP
 Sam Hamad August 11, 2010 – September 7, 2011, QLP 
 Pierre Moreau September 7, 2011 – September 4, 2012, QLP
 Sylvain Gaudreault September 4, 2012 – April 23, 2014, PQ
 Robert Poëti April 23, 2014 – January 28, 2016, QLP
 Jacques Daoust January 28, 2016 – August 19, 2016, QLP
 Laurent Lessard August 19, 2016 – October 11, 2017, QLP
 André Fortin October 11, 2017 - October 18, 2018, QLP
 Francois Bonnardel October 18, 2018- 2022 , CAQ
 Geneviève Guilbault 2022, CAQ

See also
 Government of Quebec
 Transport Canada
 Politics of Quebec
 Transport in Canada

References

External links
 Transports Québec 
 Transport Quebec

Quebec government departments and agencies
Quebec
Transport organizations based in Canada